Thomas Archer, CMG (27 February 1823 – 9 December 1905) was a pioneer pastoralist and Agent General for Queensland (Australia).

Early life
Archer was the son of William Archer and his wife Julia née Walker and was born in Glasgow, Scotland. When aged three years he was taken to Larvik, Norway, where his parents lived for the rest of their lives. Thomas was one of thirteen children.

Pastoralist and Agent-general
At fourteen years (or sixteen
) of age Archer went with an elder brother to Australia, arriving at Sydney on 31 December 1837. A brother David, had arrived earlier in 1834. Other brothers William and Thomas followed in 1838 and land was sought in New South Wales. In 1841 the Archer brothers moved over what is now the border between New South Wales and Queensland, taking about 5,000 sheep with them. Travelling approximately on the line of the present towns of Warwick and Toowoomba, they crossed the main range at Hodgson's Gap, and established themselves for four or five years in the Moreton District. They also did a good deal of exploratory work as far north as the Burnett River. In 1848 to 1849 Thomas Archer left and went to the California goldfields, returned briefly to Queensland and then went to England. In 1853 he married Grace Lindsay, daughter of James Morison, and then returned to Queensland. The harsh life, however, did not suit his young wife's health and a return was made to Scotland in 1855. Part of the next five years was spent in Norway, and most of the time between 1860 and 1872 in Scotland.

Archer was back in London with his family in 1880 and from November 1881 to May 1884 was agent-general for Queensland. He was reappointed to the position in 1888 and resigned in December 1890. While agent-general he published several pamphlets, The History Resources and Future Prospects of Queensland (London 1881); Queensland: Her History, Resources, and Future Prospects (London, 1882)  and Alleged Slavery in Queensland (1883). He also wrote Recollections of a Rambling Life (1897), printed in Yokohama for private circulation, which described his early years in Australia and his experiences in California.

Late life and legacy
Archer lived in retirement near London until his death on 9 December 1905, survived by his wife and children. He was created Companion of the Order of St Michael and St George (CMG) in 1884. Archer did much valuable exploratory work in the early days, but did not get into the history of exploration because he did not mount expeditions with definite objects in view. His brothers Charles and William did exploratory work in the country near Rockhampton, and Charles with Mr Wiseman, a police magistrate, fixed the site of that town. Another brother, Colin, sailed with a cargo up the Fitzroy River, Queensland when it was almost if not quite unknown. Colin went to Norway and became well known as a naval architect, builder of the Fram and designer of the unsinkable sailing "Rescue Boats". Thomas Archer's eldest son, William Archer, became famous as a dramatic critic, playwright, and miscellaneous writer. He was not born in Australia, and visited it only once, in 1876–1877, when he came out to see his parents and stayed six months with them at Gracemere. His A Ramble Round gives pictures of Melbourne and Sydney at that period.

See also
 The Archer brothers

References

 C. Archer, William Archer: Life, Work and Friendships;
 The Times, 11 December 1905;
 The Age, Melbourne, 13 December 1905;
 British Museum Catalogue.

External links

 William Clark, Journal of the Historical Society of Queensland, April 1919, pp. 327–37.
Archer Family photograph album, 1865-1874  Photographs include views in and around Brisbane and other Queensland towns. Digitised and held by Heritage Collections, State Library of Queensland.

1823 births
1905 deaths
Australian pastoralists
Companions of the Order of St Michael and St George
People from Larvik
19th-century Australian people
19th-century Australian businesspeople